CFR may refer to:

 Caen – Carpiquet Airport in northern France
 Căile Ferate Române, the Romanian state railway
 Canadian Finals Rodeo
 Case fatality rate, term for proportion of people dying of a disease
 Centre for Foreign Relations, Tanzania
 Certified first responder
 CFFR, a Canadian radio station once branded as "66 CFR"
 CFR Cluj, Romanian football club
 Charter of Fundamental Rights, a charter of political, social and economic rights for European Union (EU) citizens
 Code of Federal Regulations of the United States
 Compact fusion reactor, a proposed nuclear fusion reactor project
 Coronary flow reserve, a diagnostic cardiac measurement
 Cost and Freight, word used in international commerce
 Cross-Functional Requirements, another name for non-functional requirements or the "ilities" in software systems requirements and design
 Council on Foreign Relations, U.S. foreign policy think tank
 23S rRNA (adenine2503-C2,C8)-dimethyltransferase, an enzyme
 23S rRNA (adenine2503-C2)-methyltransferase, an enzyme
 Franciscan Friars of the Renewal, a religious institute in the Latin Rite of the Catholic Church commonly abbreviated "C.F.R."
 Chess Federation of Russia, the governing body for chess in Russia